"You Need a Friend" is a song recorded by Australian power pop band, Sunnyboys. It is written by lead singer-guitarist, Jeremy Oxley, and was released in April 1982 as the lead single of the band's second studio album, Individuals. "You Need a Friend" peaked at No. 38 on the Kent Music Report singles chart.

In the liner notes of the compilation album, Sunnyboys, Our Best of (December 2013), Jeremy Oxley wrote, ""You Need a Friend" is a sort of anthem for teenagers. I looked at my own experience and around at others and we were feeling the same thing. We all wanted a good time, not to be hassled. It was, and still is, a hard time in life. You are trying to find yourself and grow but wanting to do it in your own way - not how everybody is telling you how you should be." adding the film was filmed on his back verandah.

Track listing
7" vinyl
 Side A "You Need a Friend" - 4:05
 Side B "No Love Around" - 3:20

Charts

Release history

References

1982 singles
1982 songs
Sunnyboys songs
Mushroom Records singles